Akbugday can refer to:

 Akbugdaý, Turkmenistan
 Ak bugdaý District
 Akbuğday, Sivrice